Return rate is a corporate finance and accounting tool which calculates the gain and loss of investment over a certain period of time.

Nominal return
Let Pt be the price of a security at time t, including any cash dividends or interest, and let Pt − 1 be its price at t − 1.  Let RSt be the simple rate of return on the security from t − 1 to t.  Then

 

The continuously compounded rate of return or instantaneous  rate of return RCt obtained during that period is

 

If this instantaneous return is received continuously for one period, then the initial value Pt-1 will grow to   during that period.  See also continuous compounding.

Since this analysis did not adjust for the effects of inflation on the purchasing power of Pt, RS and RC are referred to as nominal rates of return.

Real return
Let  be the purchasing power of a dollar at time t (the number of bundles of consumption that can be purchased for $1). Then , where PLt is the price level at t (the dollar price of a bundle of consumption goods). Thus, continuing the above nominal example, the final value of the investment expressed in real terms is

Then the continuously compounded real rate of return  is

 

The continuously compounded real rate of return is just the continuously compounded nominal rate of return minus the continuously compounded inflation rate.

Sources

Applied mathematics